The Men's 2021 Allam British Open was the men's edition of the 2021 British Open Squash Championships, which is a 2020–21 PSA World Tour event. The event took place at the Sports Complex at the University of Hull in Hull in England between 16 and 22 August 2021. The event was sponsored by Dr Assem Allam.

The event was arranged for June instead of May because of the COVID-19 pandemic in the United Kingdom and then rearranged for August. The 2020 event had also been cancelled due to the pandemic.

New Zealand's Paul Coll defeated Egypt's Ali Farag and becomes first New Zealander to win the British Open men's squash title.

Seeds

Draw and results

Semi-finals and final

Main Draw

Top half

Bottom half

See also
2021 Women's British Open Squash Championship

References

Men's British Open
Men's British Open
British Open Squash
Men's British Open Squash Championships
Men's sport in the United Kingdom
Sport in Kingston upon Hull
Squash in England
2020s in Kingston upon Hull